The Kulpenberg is a  high mountain in the Kyffhäuser mountains, Thuringia, Germany. On it is the Kulpenberg TV tower, a telecommunication tower.

Mountains of Thuringia
Kyffhäuser